Dorothy Baker may refer to:

 Dorothy Baker (madam) (1915–1973), American madam
 Dorothy Baker (writer) (1907–1968), American novelist
 Dorothy Beecher Baker (1898–1954), American teacher